Aspergillus nutans is a species of fungus in the genus Aspergillus. It is from the Cervini section. The species was first described in 1954. It has been reported to produce terremutin and some carotenoid-like extrolites.

Growth and morphology

A. nutans has been cultivated on both Czapek yeast extract agar (CYA) plates and Malt Extract Agar Oxoid® (MEAOX) plates. The growth morphology of the colonies can be seen in the pictures below.

References 

nutans
Fungi described in 1954